Quercus grahamii is a species of oak tree in the family Fagaceae, native to Mexico, central, southwestern and the gulf state of Veracruz. It was first described by George Bentham in 1840. It is placed in Quercus section Lobatae.

References

grahamii
Flora of Central Mexico
Flora of Southwestern Mexico
Flora of Veracruz
Plants described in 1840